In general, American music may refer to music of the United States or music of the Americas.

Specifically, American Music may refer to:
 American Music Records
 American Music (journal)
 "American Music", a 1982 song by The Pointer Sisters
 "American Music" (Violent Femmes song), a song the 1991 album Why Do Birds Sing?
 American Music, a 1980 album by The Blasters and its title track
 American Music Club, a band led by Mark Eitzel
 American Music, a peer-reviewed journal published by the University of Illinois Press